Brazen Tongue is a 1940 mystery detective novel by the British writer Gladys Mitchell. It is the eleventh in her long-running series featuring the psychoanalyst and amateur detective Mrs Bradley.

Synopsis
During the early months of the Second World War in the small village of Willington, three bodies are discovered in a very short space of time leading to the investigation of Mrs Bradley.

References

Bibliography
 Klein, Kathleen Gregory. Great Women Mystery Writers: Classic to Contemporary. Greenwood Press, 1994.
 Reilly, John M. Twentieth Century Crime & Mystery Writers. Springer, 2015.

1940 British novels
Novels by Gladys Mitchell
British crime novels
Novels set in England
British detective novels
Michael Joseph books